So Well Remembered is a 1947 British drama film starring John Mills, Martha Scott, and Trevor Howard. The film was based on James Hilton's 1945 novel of the same title and tells the story of a reformer and the woman he marries in a fictional mill town in Lancashire. Hilton also narrates the film. It was shot on location in England. It is faithful to the novel in many particulars, but the motives of the main female character and the tone of the ending are considerably altered.

The first screening was in the Majestic Theatre in Macclesfield on 9 August 1947, after which the film disappeared. It was rediscovered 60 years later in Tennessee, in the United States, by Muttley McLad of the band The Macc Lads.

Plot
At the end of the Second World War George Boswell (John Mills), a town councillor, newspaper editor and zealous reformer in the mill town of Browdley in Lancashire, recalls the past 26 years of his life.

In 1919 he defends Olivia Channing (Martha Scott) when she applies for a library job. Her father, the mill owner John Channing (Frederick Leister), has been sent to prison for almost 20 years for speculating with, and losing, many townspeople's money. George falls in love with Olivia, though it scandalises the town, and he eventually proposes to her. That night she has an argument with her father. He has Dr Richard Whiteside (Trevor Howard) drive him into town to speak to George, but they crash on a washed-out road and John is killed. Olivia then agrees to marry George.

Trevor Mangin (Reginald Tate), Browdley's most influential businessman, asks George to run for Parliament. Seeing an opportunity to further his reforming efforts, George agrees, much to Olivia's delight.

Whiteside brings George an alarming report about the danger of an epidemic in the town's filthy slums. Mangin, who owns many of them, produces a more optimistic report. Given that Whiteside has taken to drinking heavily since the accident, George accepts Mangin's report, causing the council to vote to do nothing. However, a diphtheria epidemic breaks out, just as Whiteside feared. A free clinic is opened to inoculate the healthy children and treat the sick. George tells Olivia to take their son there, but she cannot bear to do so, and the boy dies.

After George drops out of the election because of Mangin's lies Olivia tells him that she is leaving him. George realises that she married him solely for his prospects. They go their separate ways. He eventually rises to the mayoralty of the town, while she remarries a rich man and has another son, Charles Winslow (Richard Carlson). Meanwhile, Whiteside takes in a baby girl, Julie Morgan (Patricia Roc), orphaned at birth, and George helps to raise her.

Many years pass. Early in the Second World War a widowed Olivia returns, takes up residence in her father's mansion and reopens the Channing mill. Her son becomes a flier in the Royal Air Force. On leave he meets Julie and they fall in love, but Olivia does not want to relinquish her control over her son. Charles is seriously injured in combat and his face is disfigured. This enables Olivia to isolate him until George manages to convince him to break free and marry Julie. When Olivia arrives, looking for her son, George reveals that he has worked out that Olivia did nothing to prevent her father from driving to his death, though she must have known that the road was washed out. Whiteside had overheard the Channings arguing and knew that John Channing intended to warn George against her.

Cast
 John Mills as George Boswell
 Martha Scott as Olivia Channing Boswell
 Patricia Roc as Julie Morgan
 Trevor Howard as Dr Richard Whiteside
 Richard Carlson as Charles Winslow
 Reginald Tate as Trevor Mangin
 Beatrice Varley as Annie, George's loyal servant
 Frederick Leister as John Channing
 Ivor Barnard as Spivey
 Julian D'Albie as Wetherall, the outgoing Member of Parliament

Mills's daughters Juliet and Hayley played Julie as a young girl and a baby respectively.

The music for the film was composed by Hanns Eisler.

Production
The film was mainly shot at Denham Film Studios in Denham, Buckinghamshire. Exteriors were filmed in Macclesfield, Cheshire, forming the backdrop of a Lancashire mill town.

Reception

Box office
According to trade papers, the film was a "notable box office attraction" at British cinemas in 1947.  Nevertheless, it recorded a loss of $378,000.

Dore Schary, then head of RKO, said that he did not release the film when he was in charge of the studio "because I thought it was a stinker".

See also 
 List of British films of 1947

References

External links 
 
 
 
 
 Review of film at Variety

1947 films
1947 drama films
British black-and-white films
British drama films
Films based on British novels
Films directed by Edward Dmytryk
Films set in Lancashire
Films shot in Cheshire
Films shot at Denham Film Studios
1940s English-language films
1940s British films